Starenky is a rural locality (a khutor) in Kirovskoye Rural Settlement, Sredneakhtubinsky District, Volgograd Oblast, Russia. The population was 243 as of 2010.

Geography 
Starenky is located 24 km northwest of Srednyaya Akhtuba (the district's administrative centre) by road. Prikanalny is the nearest rural locality.

References

rural localities in Sredneakhtubinsky District